Sally McCann (born 30 April 1969) is an Australian former professional tennis player.

McCann, an AIS trained player from Brisbane, was a junior doubles finalist at the 1985 Australian Open.

While competing on the professional tour she reached a best singles ranking of 208 in the world, winning three ITF satellite tournaments. She made the second round of the 1988 Australian Open, with a win over Brenda Schultz.

ITF finals

Singles: 5 (3–2)

Doubles: 4 (2–2)

References

External links
 
 

1969 births
Living people
Australian female tennis players
Tennis players from Brisbane